Pátria was a gunboat in the Portuguese Navy launched in 1903 at Lisbon. She was acquired with the funds of the Great National Subscription shortly after the 1890 British Ultimatum. In 1905 she left for the Naval Division of Angola and in the same year she made a trip to Brazil. In 1908 she left for the Macau Naval Station, and did a long service. She took part in the suppression of the Timor revolt in 1912. In 1930, she was ordered to disarm and passed to the state of complete disarmament the following year, in Macau. She was sold to China in 1931.

Specifications
Her main specifications were:

Naval Tonnage:   636 tons
Length:          60 metres
Width:           8.4 metres
Power (Engine):  1860 H.P.
Average speed:   12 knots

She had two triple-expansion steam engines, two pipe boilers and various auxiliary engines and a work-shop.  The electric installations included two searchlights, two steam dynamos and one group generator. She carried five anchors, two mooring chains, two lifeboats, agave and canvassed ropes and six water tanks.

References

Ships of the Portuguese Navy
Ships built in Portugal
1903 ships